Daphnusa philippinensis is a species of moth of the  family Sphingidae. It is known from the Philippines.

References

Smerinthini
Moths described in 2009